Ernesto Bonacina (11 November 1902 – 4 November 1944) was an Italian sprinter.

Biography
He competed in the men's 100 metres and the 4 × 100 metres relay events at the 1924 Summer Olympics. He had three caps for the national team from 1924 to 1928. His personal best in the 100 metres was 10.8 established in 1926. His athletic club was Sport Club Italia.

Bonacina won three team relay events at the national championship. On 16 June 1918 he won the Race of Sesto San Giovanni in Milan organized by Club Audace. Second place went to Italo Vacher while Pietro Sperti was third.

Olympic results

National championships
2 wins in 4×100 metres relay (1921, 1922)
1 win in Olympic relay (1921)

References

External links
 
 Italian Olympians BONA-BONE 

1902 births
1944 deaths
Athletes (track and field) at the 1924 Summer Olympics
Italian male sprinters
Olympic athletes of Italy
Athletes from Milan